Florence Provendier (born 28 October 1965) is a French politician who was Member of Parliament for Hauts-de-Seine's 10th constituency from 2018 to 2022.

Education 
She graduated from ESSEC Business School.

Political career 
In the 2017 French legislative election, she was a substitute candidate. She replaced Gabriel Attal in Parliament when he was appointed Government Spokesperson.

See also 

 List of deputies of the 15th National Assembly of France

References 

Living people
1965 births
People from Saint-Denis, Seine-Saint-Denis
People from Hauts-de-Seine
La République En Marche! politicians
21st-century French women politicians
Deputies of the 15th National Assembly of the French Fifth Republic
Politicians from Île-de-France
Women members of the National Assembly (France)
Members of Parliament for Hauts-de-Seine